Vukov Spomenik railway station is an underground rail station in Belgrade, the capital of Serbia. Located in the urban neighborhood Vukov Spomenik, in the municipality Zvezdara, the railway continues to Karađorđe's Park railway station in one direction and the Pančevo Bridge station in the other direction. Vukov Spomenik railway station consists of 2 railway tracks. It has been described as "one of the most beautiful railway objects, built in the worst period of the state".

History 

Construction began in 1989, during the existence of the Socialist Federative Republic of Yugoslavia and more-or-less stable situation. However, major works were conducted in the 1990s, during the international embargo imposed on the succeeding  Federal Republic of Yugoslavia. According to the mayor of Belgrade during the construction, Slobodanka Gruden, one of the financiers was a would-be banker Dafina Milanović, head of one of the largest pyramid schemes in Serbia. As a counter service, she was to be awarded with the numerous office space in the commercial section of the station. However, her scheme fell apart in 1993, before the station was finished. The project was executed by the Energoprojekt company.

Architect Miroslav Simeunović was in charge of the quality and deadlines control during the construction. Hurrying to finish one of the phases, a section below the Ruzveltova Street, was hastily done. The section spread from the station to the Technical faculties across the Ruzveltova and consisted of the upper layer with the carriageways above it. In a hurry to finish it to January 1994 a botched insulation using the sub-standard foil was used. Simeunović protested but his contract was unilaterally breached. The layer was simply buried, the carriageway was paved with asphalt and the tram rails were placed. After the first rain, water came through the protective layer, flooding the shops in the commercial zone and all attempts to fix the problem from the inside failed. Simeunović pointed out that the excellent opportunity to fix the problem was the massive reconstruction of Ruzveltova in 2017, but the protective layer of the station remained as it was.

Projected as one of the stations of the future Belgrade Metro, it was opened on 7 July 1995.

Characteristics 

The station is projected to accommodate 15,000 passengers per hour, but as it never took the role intended within the Belgrade railway junction or Belgrade Metro, this number was never achieved. Still, it became one of the most important hubs in the Belgrade railway system. It became an intercity station when in 2018 it began serving the trains to Vršac.

The descent by escalators takes a minute and a half.

The interior was mostly done in granite, with decorative details. The station is embellished with several reliefs, including one called "Belgrade since the time of despot Stefan", and Cyrillic letters.

In 2016 city organized design competition and the project for revitalization of both the underground station and the plateau above it was chosen in 2017. All obstacles were to be removed from the plateau and to integrate it in the surrounding Cyril and Methodius Park. Though accepted and green-lighted, the project remained on paper only. As of 2018, the facility somewhat deteriorated. The escalators are in bad shape and out of use for years, the numerous shops, intended for the commercial venues, are mostly empty while the slabs on the plateau above it also deteriorated. It is expected that the station will be refurbished after the construction of the subway starts. Condition of the venue worsened and in April 2019 deputy mayor Goran Vesić said that the Vukov Spomenik station is in the "worst shape of all" urban train stations. In April 2022, state railway company announced that some minor repairs were conducted, and that €3 million were allocated for the incoming, full reconstruction.

Gallery

See also 
 Serbian Railways
 Belgrade railway junction
 Beovoz
 BG Voz
 Vukov Spomenik

References 

Railway stations in Belgrade
Palilula, Belgrade